One Balita Pilipinas (formerly known as One Balita) is the rolling newscast service of One PH, the 24/7  Filipino-language cable news channel of Cignal TV.

Serving as the channel's flagship newscast, the main noontime edition airs on weekdays from 12:00 PM to 1:00 PM, while its primetime edition airs from 7:30 PM to 8:00 PM (PST).

The newscasts are simulcast on radio through Radyo5 92.3 True FM in Mega Manila and its provincial Radyo5 stations nationwide. It is also simulcast on One News, the English-language sister news channel of One PH.

The newscast also airs worldwide via Kapatid Channel and Aksyon TV International.

Background
 
One Balita is the radio-TV newscast of the FM radio station Radyo5 and radio-TV news channel One PH. The program is also similar to other radio-television or teleradyo news programs during noontime such as Headline Pilipinas of DZMM, and DZRH Network News of DZRH, because it is broadcasting live from a television news studio but simulcast on radio and television feed instead of using the radio studio for the radio feed.

History

As a noontime newscast

The newscast was first known on-air as One Balita, a fifteen-minute noontime newscast focused on fast-delivered headlines of the day. It was launched on February 18, 2019, at 12:00 n.n. It was first anchored by Raffy Tulfo, and Jamie Herrell, then replaced by Marga Vargas (Tulfo and Vargas was also an anchor for now-defunct TV5's noontime news and public service program Aksyon sa Tanghali, which was served as a lead-in newscast for the latter).

Primetime edition

On September 9, One PH debuted the newscasts' primetime edition under the name One Balita Pilipinas, It was first anchored by Cheryl Cosim. In the interim, it replaced the first 15 minutes of its companion program Sa Totoo Lang (which focuses on refining and analyzing top stories), serves as the lead-in newscast for "Sa Totoo Lang" on the channel before the latter was bumped to 7:15 pm and reduced its time to 45 minutes.

On September 23, 2019, both editions of the newscast started to air on TV5. The noontime edition was reformatted into a three-way simulcast on TV5 One PH and Radyo5 and expanded into 30 minutes, with the Pilipinas primetime edition airing tape-delayed at 10 p.m.; serving as TV5's de facto late-night newscast, replacing the English-language The Big Story, produced by sister station One News. Cosim previously anchored TV5-produced Aksyon Tonite before its cancellation in 2019.

On February 28, 2020, One Balita Pilipinas aired its last episode on TV5, reverting it to a satellite-exclusive newscast via One PH, but remains simulcasting on Radyo5 outside PBA game dates.

COVID-19 pandemic reformat changes
On March 17, 2020, both editions of the newscast were placed on hiatus as One PH opted to air sister channel's One News special coverage on the Luzon-wide Enhanced Community Quarantine period against the COVID-19 pandemic.

On May 7, 2020, One Balita Pilipinas went back on air as part of the provisional programming of TV5, One PH, One News (later removed), and Radyo5. It airs every weeknight at 6:30 pm and is presented by Cheryl Cosim and News5 chief correspondent Ed Lingao.

On June 1, 2020, the newscast launch its new titlecard and OBB. On the same day, the original noontime edition of the newscast went back on air and it was renamed as "One Balita Pilipinas," which resulted to air twice a day with the same name.

On June 8, 2020, One PH launched a new program titled Idol in Action, which features live public service on television and is presented by Raffy Tulfo, with Marga Vargas and MJ Marfori. After 2 complainants and some segments, they will proceed to the news using the name of One Balita Pilipinas. The format of the show is similar to Aksyon sa Tanghali and Balitaang Tapat which contain news and public service.

Relaunch
On September 14, 2020, One PH announced that Jay Taruc will be the newest anchor for the primetime newscast on October 5, replacing both Cosim and Lingao, as the said primetime edition will be airing its last broadcast on TV5 by October 2, reverting again to a satellite-exclusive newscast via One PH for the second time since February 28, and it was replaced by the newest primetime newscast, Frontline Pilipinas which will debut on the same day at the same time, thus placing the primetime edition moved to an earlier time at 5:30 pm. It also presents new segments such as Bilog ang Balita, Mojo: Mobile Journo, and Ride PH Group. The newscast will be ended on October 1, 2020.

On October 2, 2020, Cosim replaced Tulfo as the anchor of the newscast's original noontime edition which aired on TV5 until October 16 to make way for the launch of Lunch Out Loud on October 19.

On April 5, 2021, the primetime edition moved to a new time at 7:30 pm to give way to One PH's simulcast of Frontline Pilipinas, which moved to 5:30 pm that same day.

In October 2021, both editions started to air on One News, the English-language sister news channel of One PH. The noontime edition is aired simultaneously on One PH, Radyo5, and One News, while the evening edition is aired on One News via delayed telecast.

On February 15, 2022, former actor and UNTV news anchor Diego Castro III joined Cheryl Cosim in the noontime edition. The team-up of Cosim and Castro on the news program lasted until January 6, 2023.

Newscast editions

Noontime edition
The noontime edition was originally aired weekdays from 12:00 to 12:30 p.m. It is aired on a simulcast basis on One PH and Radyo5. It was also simulcasted on TV5 from September 23, 2019, to October 16, 2020.

Currently, it airs every weekday from 12:00 to 1:00 p.m. since October 4, 2021. It airs over One PH and One News. Radyo5 simulcasted the noontime edition from 2019 until January 20, 2023 as the station launches its new inhouse programming lineup on January 23.

Main presenter
 Cheryl Cosim

Segment presenters
 Robert Teo 
 MJ Marfori 
 Hannibal Talete

Former presenters
 Raffy Tulfo 
 Jamie Herrell 
 Marga Vargas 
 Diego Castro III

Segments
 Alagang Kapatid (Public Service)
 Metro (Police Report)
 Paspas Balita (Regional)
 Patikim (Intro)
 MoJo: Mobile Journo (Citizen Journalism)
 Weather Update
 ¡Hola! (Entertainment)
 The Game (Sports)
 Hani ng Bayan

Evening edition
The evening edition was originally aired weeknights from 7:00 to 7:15 p.m. on One PH and simulcast on Radyo5 outside of PBA playdates. It was also aired on a delayed basis from 10:00 to 10:30 p.m. on TV5 from September 23, 2019, until February 28, 2020. Due to the COVID-19 special coverage of One PH, it was aired live on TV5, One PH, and Radyo5, weeknights at 6:30 pm from May 7 to October 2, 2020. From October 5, 2020, to March 31, 2021, the program was aired from 5:30 to 6:00 p.m. on One PH and Radyo5.

Currently, it airs every weeknight from 7:30 to 8:00 p.m. since April 5, 2021. The program also airs on One News as a delayed broadcast every weeknight from 9:30 to 10:00 p.m. Radyo5 simulcasted the evening edition from 2019 until January 20, 2023 as the station launches its new inhouse programming lineup on January 23.

Main presenter
 Jay Taruc

Segment presenter
 Lourd de Veyra {{small|(since 2020, Bilog ang Balita')}}

Former presenters
 Ed Lingao 
 Cheryl Cosim 

Segments
 MoJo: Mobile Journo (Citizen Journalism)
 Bilog Ang Balita (History Trivia)
 The Game (Sports)

Weekend edition
The weekend edition was started on May 7, 2022, and airs every Saturday and Sunday from 10:30 to 11:00 p.m. on One PH and simulcast on One News. Radyo5 simulcasts the newscast's Saturday edition, making the edition as one that has a radio-television simulcast.

Main presenter
 Angela Lagunzad 

Segment presenter
 Mon Gualvez 

Segments
 Baon ni Mon
 ¡Hola! (Entertainment)

One Balita NgayonOne Balita Ngayon (literally translated as One News Now'' of sister channel One News) is a Philippine television news broadcasting show broadcast by One PH premiered on February 15, 2021.

Overview
It features different headlines throughout the day from morning and afternoon on weekdays, and from morning to evening on weekends. The format is similar to One News Now of the sister channel One News.

Presenters
 Chiqui Vergel 
 Mon Gualvez 
 Julie Baiza 
 Rizza Diaz 
 King Sengco 
 Angela Lagunzad 
 Diego Castro III 
 Pamela Vasquez 
 Jes Delos Santos 
 Roby Alampay

See also 
 Aksyon
 Andar ng mga Balita
 Pilipinas News
 News5
 One PH

References

News5 shows
TV5 (Philippine TV network) news shows
TV5 (Philippine TV network) original programming
One PH original programming
Philippine television news shows
2019 Philippine television series debuts
2020s Philippine television series
Filipino-language television shows